The Course de la Paix U23 – Grand Prix Jeseníky is a stage road cycling race held annually in the Czech Republic. It is part of the UCI Europe Tour in category 2.ncup, meaning it is part of the UCI Under 23 Nations' Cup. It had a rating of 2.2U from 2013 to 2014, and was upgraded to 2.ncup in 2015.

Winners

References

External links

Cycle races in the Czech Republic
UCI Europe Tour races
Recurring sporting events established in 2013
2013 establishments in the Czech Republic
Under-23 cycle racing